Rondo is a town in Lee County, Arkansas, United States. The population was 198 at the 2010 census, down from 237 at the 2000 census.

Geography

Rondo is located in southern Lee County at  (34.658789, -90.822236).

Demographics

As of the census of 2000, there were 237 people, 99 households, and 69 families residing in the town. The population density was 90.6/km (235.6/mi2). There were 113 housing units at an average density of 43.2/km (112.4/mi2). The racial makeup of the town was 26.16% White, 70.04% Black or African American, and 3.80% from two or more races. 1.69% of the population were Hispanic or Latino of any race.

There were 99 households, out of which 24.2% had children under the age of 18 living with them, 36.4% were married couples living together, 32.3% had a female householder with no husband present, and 30.3% were non-families. 28.3% of all households were made up of individuals, and 15.2% had someone living alone who was 65 years of age or older. The average household size was 2.39 and the average family size was 2.90.

In the town, the population was spread out, with 25.7% under the age of 18, 6.8% from 18 to 24, 22.4% from 25 to 44, 27.4% from 45 to 64, and 17.7% who were 65 years of age or older. The median age was 42 years. For every 100 females, there were 76.9 males. For every 100 females age 18 and over, there were 69.2 males.

The median income for a household in the town was $15,000, and the median income for a family was $26,250. Males had a median income of $25,000 versus $16,667 for females. The per capita income for the town was $13,601. About 32.7% of families and 38.7% of the population were below the poverty line, including 48.6% of those under the age of eighteen and 46.7% of those 65 or over.

Education
It is in the Lee County School District, based in Marianna. The local high school is Lee High School.

See also

Old Rondo Cemetery

References

Towns in Lee County, Arkansas
Towns in Arkansas